Legend is an album by British blues rock musician Peter Green, who was the founder of Fleetwood Mac and a member from 1967–70. Released in 1988, it contained tracks from and outtakes recorded for his four PVK albums from 1979-83.

Peter Green's songwriting credits were under his original name of Peter Greenbaum. Many of the tracks were composed by Peter's brother, Mike Green.

Track listing
"Touch My Spirit" (Mike Green)  
"Six String Guitar" (M. Green) 
"Proud Pinto" (P. Green)  
"The Clown" (M. Green)  
"You Won't See Me Anymore" (Mike Green)  
"Long Way From Home" (Mike Green)  
"Little Dreamer" (P. Green)
"In The Skies" (P. Green)
"Rubbing My Eyes" (Mike Green)  
"What Am I Doing Here" (Mike Green)  
"Corner Of My Mind" (Mike Green)  
"Carry My Love" (Mike Green)  
"Bandit" (Peter Greenbaum, M. Green) 
"White Sky" (M. Green)

Tracks 3, 8 are from In The Skies
Tracks 9-10, 13 are outtakes from Little Dreamer
Track 7 is from Little Dreamer
Tracks 2, 5-6 are outtakes from Whatcha Gonna Do?
Tracks 1, 11-12 are outtakes from White Sky
Tracks 4, 14 are from White Sky

Personnel
Peter Green – lead, rhythm guitar, vocals
Mike Green – vocals 
Ronnie Johnson – rhythm guitar
Larry Steele – bass guitar
Paul Westwood – bass guitar
Mo Foster – bass guitar 
Webster Johnson – keyboards
Roy Shipston – keyboards
Reg Isidore – drums
Dave Mattacks – drums
Jeff Whittaker – percussion

Production
Produced by Peter Vernon-Kell (1-3, 5-10, 13), Peter Green & Geoff Robinson (1,4, 11-12, 14)

References

Peter Green (musician) albums
1988 compilation albums